The Switzerland national badminton team represents Switzerland in international badminton team competitions. It is controlled by Swiss Badminton, Switzerland's governing body for badminton. The Swiss national team debuted in the Sudirman Cup in 1991. The men's and women's team debuted in the 2006 European Men's and Women's Team Badminton Championships in Greece.

The best result the team has achieved was when the women's team reached the quarterfinals of the 2012 European Women's Team Badminton Championships.

Participation in BWF competitions

Sudirman Cup

Participation in European Team Badminton Championships

Men's Team

Women's Team

Mixed Team

Participation in Helvetia Cup 
The Helvetia Cup or European B Team Championships was a European mixed team championship in badminton. The first Helvetia Cup tournament took place in Zurich, Switzerland in 1962. The tournament took place every two years from 1971 until 2007, after which it was dissolved. Switzerland participated in every edition of the Helvetia Cup except in 1999.

Participation in European Junior Team Badminton Championships
Mixed Team

Current squad 
The following players were selected to represent Switzerland at the 2019 Sudirman Cup.

Male players
Tobias Künzi
Oliver Schaller
Christian Kirchmayr

Female players
Céline Burkart
Jenjira Stadelmann
Sabrina Jaquet
Ronja Stern

References

Badminton
National badminton teams
Badminton in Switzerland